Greenwood was a federal electoral district represented in the House of Commons of Canada from 1935 to 1979. It was located in east end of the city of Toronto in the province of Ontario. This riding was created in 1933 from parts of Toronto East and Toronto—Scarborough ridings.
 
It initially was bounded on the south by Lake Ontario, on the east by Woodbine Avenue, on the north by the city limits, and on the west by the eastern boundary of Broadview riding.

In 1947, the western limit was redefined to be (from north to south) from the city limit south along Langford Avenue, east along Danforth Avenue, south along Jones Avenue, east along Queen Street East, south along Rushbrook Avenue, east along Eastern Avenue, and south along Leslie Street to Lake Ontario.

In 1966, it was redefined to be bounded on the east by  the east limit of the City of Toronto and Victoria Park Avenue, on the north by a line drawn west along Danforth Avenue, north along Woodbine Avenue, west along Milverton Boulevard, on the west by Greenwood Avenue, and including the area south of Queen Street East between Greenwood and Leslie Street.

The electoral district was abolished in 1976 when it was redistributed between Beaches and York East ridings.

Members of Parliament

This riding has elected the following Members of Parliament:

Election results

1933 Boundaries

|}

|}

|}

1947 Boundaries

|}

On Mr. McMillin's death before taking his seat, 20 August 1949:

|}

|}

|}

|}

|}

|}

|}

1966 Boundaries

|}

|}

|}

See also 

 List of Canadian federal electoral districts
 Past Canadian electoral districts

External links 
Riding history from the Library of Parliament

Former federal electoral districts of Ontario
Federal electoral districts of Toronto